The Other Sport is a 2013 SVT three-part documentary television series produced by Freedom From Choice and Sveriges Television zooming in on the conditions of Women's football in Sweden since the first clubs got structurally organized in the mid-1960s until this very day through the early dominance of Öxabäcks IF in the 1970s and 1980s, the importance of Umeå IK in the 2000s, Sweden winning the first UEFA Women's Championship in 1984 and until 2013 when the UEFA Women's Euro 2013 was played in Sweden.

The three various approaches to story are told from the perspective of today's reality - The Winning Call - from yesterday's reality - Women Against The Tide - as well as through a chronological study and insight to the important dates and decisive moments throughout history showing the developments of women's football in Sweden - in Play Seriously.

The documentary series is created by Mattias Löw, Valentina Santi Löw and Orvar Anklew and features women football stars Marta Vieira da Silva, Lotta Schelin, Kosovare Asllani, Hope Solo former stars Hanna Ljungberg, Victoria Sandell Svensson, Lena Videkull, Anette Börjesson, the 2012 FIFA World Coach of the Year Pia Sundhage, former Sweden women's national football team coach Marika Domanski-Lyfors, Icelandic coach Elisabet Gunnarsdottir as well as the first woman to coach a national football team Gunilla Paijkull, former Sweden women's national football team goalkeeper Elisabeth Leidinge and long-time Sweden women's national football team coach Thomas Dennerby.

The Other Sport has been selected for various film, TV and journalism festivals around the world and won several nominations and awards, most notably at the New York Television Festival. The documentary series was the curtain raiser at the ViBGYOR Film Festival in Thrissur, India.

Reception
 Swedish Radio - "Absolutely excellent."
 Dagens Nyheter, Sweden - "A must-see with great close-up portraits."
 Svenska Dagbladet, Sweden - "Exceptionally good and really stylish."
 Good Morning Sweden - "Amazing interviews and pace, and beautiful music."
 Aftonbladet, Sweden - "A brilliant documentary series."
 Sveriges Television, Sweden - "The best sport."
 Swedish Football Association - "History, incredibly well told."

References
Sources

Notes

External links

2010s television miniseries
Women's football in Sweden
Sveriges Television original programming